Mohammadabad-e Sheykh (also Romanized as Moḩammadābād-e Sheykh and Mohammad Abad Sheikh; also known as Moḩammadābād and Moḩammadābād-e Sheyj) is a village in Rud Ab-e Sharqi Rural District, Rud Ab District, Narmashir County, Kerman Province, Iran. At the 2006 census, its population was 1,012, in 263 families.

References 

Populated places in Narmashir County